Mohammadbagher Sadeghi (born 1 April 1989) is an Iranian football goalkeeper.

Club career
He was a product of Zob Ahan youth system. He joined the first team in 2007–08 season. After spending five season with Zob Ahan and making only nine appearances in his last season, he transferred to Sepahan under a three-year contract in July 2012. His contract was terminated in summer 2013 and he joined Saipa.

Club career statistics

International career
He was a part of Iran national under-20 football team participating in AFC U-19 Championship 2008.

Honours
Zob Ahan
AFC Champions League: 2010 (Runner-up)
Iran Pro League: 2008–09 (Runner-up), 2009–10 (Runner-up) 
Hazfi Cup (3): 2008–09, 2014–15, 2015–16

Sepahan
Hazfi Cup (1): 2012–13

Notes

Iranian footballers
Persian Gulf Pro League players
Zob Ahan Esfahan F.C. players
Sepahan S.C. footballers
Sportspeople from Isfahan
Living people
1989 births
Association football goalkeepers
Iran under-20 international footballers